Cheilotoma voriseki is a species of leaf beetles from the subfamily Cryptocephalinae. It can be found in Turkey on Mount Nemrut in Adıyaman.

References

Clytrini
Beetles described in 2003
Invertebrates of Turkey